Joshua Ray Pearce (born August 20, 1977 in Yakima, Washington) is a former Major League Baseball pitcher who played for the St. Louis Cardinals from  to .

Pearce was drafted by the New York Mets out of West Valley High School in Yakima, Washington in the 1996 Major League Baseball Draft, but did not sign. Instead, he attended Portland State University (1998), the University of Arizona and was drafted by the St. Louis Cardinals in the 2nd round of the 1999 Major League Baseball Draft. Though not dominant in the minors, he steadily worked his way up the ranks and made his major league debut on April 20, 2002; he pitched 4.2 innings and gave up 3 earned runs, getting a no-decision. In , Pearce pitched in relief for Triple-A Memphis and had a 3.56 ERA in 26 games. In , his last professional season, he pitched for Double-A Springfield and Memphis. His season ended because he made his team lose 10 games in a row.

External links
Baseball-Reference
Baseball-Cube

1977 births
Living people
Baseball players from Washington (state)
Major League Baseball pitchers
Arizona Wildcats baseball players
New Jersey Cardinals players
Arkansas Travelers players
New Haven Ravens players
Memphis Redbirds players
Palm Beach Cardinals players
Tennessee Smokies players
Springfield Cardinals players
St. Louis Cardinals players